Carlos Flores may refer to:

Politicians
Carlos Flores Dueñas (born 1948), Mexican politician
Carlos Roberto Flores (born 1950), President of Honduras 1998–2002
Carlos Flores Rico (born 1952), Mexican politician
Carlos Flores (Spanish politician) (born 1964)

Sportspeople

Association football
Carlos Flores (footballer, 1974–2019), Peru international midfielder
Carlos Flores (footballer, born 1978), Peruvian football centre-back
Carlos Flores (footballer, born 1988), Peruvian football midfielder

Other sports
Carlos Julio Flores (born 1980), Venezuelan windsurfer

See also 
Fernando Flores (born 1943), Chilean politician, full name Carlos Fernando Flores Labra
Carlos Rivera Flores (born 1989), Mexican footballer